The 1993–94 Iowa Hawkeyes men's basketball team represented the University of Iowa as members of the Big Ten Conference. The team was led by eighth-year head coach Tom Davis and played their home games at Carver-Hawkeye Arena. They ended the season 11–16 overall and 5–13 in Big Ten play.

Roster

Schedule/results

|-
!colspan=8| Non-Conference Regular Season
|-

|-
!colspan=8| Big Ten Regular Season
|-

References

Iowa Hawkeyes
Iowa Hawkeyes men's basketball seasons
Hawk
Hawk